The following is an alphabetical list of members of the United States House of Representatives from the state of Texas. For chronological tables of members of both houses of the United States Congress from the state (through the present day), see United States congressional delegations from Texas.  The list of names should be complete as of January 3, 2023, but other data may be incomplete.

Current members 
:
 : Nathaniel Moran (R) (since 2023)
 : Dan Crenshaw (R) (since 2019)
 : Keith Self (R) (since 2023)
 :  Pat Fallon (R) (since 2021)
 : Lance Gooden (R) (since 2019)
 : Jake Ellzey (R) (since 2021)
 : Lizzie Fletcher (D) (since 2019)
 : Morgan Luttrell (R) (since 2023)
 : Al Green (D) (since 2005)
 : Michael McCaul (R) (since 2005)
 : August Pfluger (R) (since 2021)
 : Kay Granger (R) (since 1997)
 : Ronny Jackson (R) (since 2021)
 : Randy Weber (R) (since 2013)
 : Monica De La Cruz (R) (since 2023)
 : Veronica Escobar (D) (since 2019)
 : Pete Sessions (R) (since 2021)
 : Sheila Jackson Lee (D) (since 1995)
 : Jodey Arrington (R) (since 2017)
 : Joaquin Castro (D) (since 2013)
 : Chip Roy (R) (since 2019)
 : Troy Nehls (R) (since 2021)
 : Tony Gonzales (R) (since 2021)
 : Beth Van Duyne (R) (since 2021)
 : Roger Williams (R) (since 2013)
 : Michael Burgess (R) (since 2003)
 : Michael Cloud (R) (since 2018)
 : Henry Cuellar (D) (since 2005)
 : Sylvia Garcia (D) (since 2019)
 : Jasmine Crockett (D) (since 2023)
 : John Carter (R) (since 2003)
 : Colin Allred (D) (since 2019)
 : Marc Veasey (D) (since 2013)
 : Vicente Gonzalez (D) (since 2017)
 : Greg Casar (D) (since 2023)
 : Brian Babin (R) (since 2015)
 : Lloyd Doggett (D) (since 1995)
 : Wesley Hunt (R) (since 2023)

List of members

See also

List of United States senators from Texas
United States congressional delegations from Texas
Texas's congressional districts

References

Texas
United States repr